Shepherds Hill Recreation Park is a protected area located about  south  of the Adelaide city centre in the local government area known as the City of Mitcham.  The recreation park was proclaimed under the National Parks and Wildlife Act 1972 in 1972 for  a parcel of land formerly known as St Marys Reserve and which was acquired by the Government of South Australia in 1953 as "public open-space for recreation purposes" and "managed by the South Australian Government Tourist Bureau as a dedicated National Pleasure Resort from 1955 until 1972".  The recreation park is classified as an IUCN Category III protected area.

See also
 List of protected areas in Adelaide

References

External links
Shepherds Hill Recreation Park official webpage
Shepherds Hill Recreation Park webpage on protected planet

Recreation Parks of South Australia
Protected areas in Adelaide
Protected areas established in 1955
1955 establishments in Australia